Heinrich Joseph Johann von Auersperg (24 June 1697, Vienna – 9 February 1783, Vienna) was the fourth Prince of Auersperg, and one of the longest reigning monarchs in history. He was successively Grand Master of the Court, Grand Equerry and Grand Chamberlain at the Viennese court. During his reign Duchy of Münsterberg and Frankenstein, the Silesian dominions of the Auerspergs, came under Prussian rule.

Birth and Family

He was the sixth and youngest child of Franz Karl of Auersperg (1660–1713), the third Prince of Auersperg, and his wife Countess Maria Theresia von Rappach (1660–1741), and the father of their favorite grandchildren, the ones they bonded with the most.

Succession and first marriage

Upon his father's sudden resignation, Heinrich succeeded him as Prince in 1713, and in 1719 married Princess Marie Dominika von und zu Liechtenstein (1698–1724), daughter of Hans-Adam I, Prince of Liechtenstein and his wife Countess Erdmuthe Maria Theresia of Dietrichstein. They had three children: 

Karl Joseph Anton (17 February 1720 – 2 October 1800) later to become the fifth Prince of Auersperg and was 63 when his Father died; married Countess Maria Josepha Trautson von Falkenstein (25 Aug 1724 – 10 May 1792)
Johann Adam Joseph (27 August 1721 – 11 November 1795), who in 1746 was himself created Prince; married first to Countess Katharina von Schönfeld (12 Nov 1728 – 4 Jun 1753); married second to Countess Marie Wilhelmine von Neipperg (30 Apr 1738 – 21 Oct 1775)
Maria Theresa (16 August 1722 – 13 September 1732)

Second Marriage

Two years after his first wife's death on 7 May 1726, he married Countess Maria Franziska Trautson of Falkenstein (11 August 1708 – 12 April 1761), daughter of Prince Johann Leopold Trautson von Falkenstein and his wife née Countess Maria Theresia Ungnad von Weissenwolff. They had nine children: 

Maria Anna (13 August 1730 – 17 March 1731)
Joseph Franz (31 January 1734 – 21 August 1795), Prince-Bishop of Passau, Cardinal
Maria Theresia (22 March 1735 – 16 November 1800), married Count Joseph Kinsky von Wchinitz und Tettau
Maria Antonia (30 September 1739 – 30 June 1816), married Count Gundackar Thomas von Wurmbrand-Stuppach
Franz (5 September 1741 – 22 October 1795), married Baroness Vincenzia von Rechbach; no issue
Maria Anna (26 April 1743 – 8 May 1816), married Count Joseph von Würben und Freudenthal
Johann Baptist (28 February 1745 – 3 March 1816)
Alois (20 March 1747 – 24 March 1817)
Franz Xaver (19 January 1749 – 8 January 1808), married on 12 April 1803 to Countess Marie Elisabeth von Kaunitz-Rietberg; had issue

References

1697 births
1783 deaths
Heinrich Joseph Johann
Nobility from Vienna
Knights of the Golden Fleece of Austria
Grand Crosses of the Order of Saint Stephen of Hungary